Patrick Joseph Cassidy (1891 – after 1912) was an Irish footballer who played as a goalkeeper.

References

1891 births
20th-century deaths
Year of death missing
Association footballers from Dublin (city)
Irish association footballers (before 1923)
Association football goalkeepers
Bohemian F.C. players
Shelbourne F.C. players
Grimsby Town F.C. players
English Football League players